SpaceX CRS-17, also known as SpX-17, was a Commercial Resupply Services mission (CRS) to the International Space Station that was launched aboard a Falcon 9 rocket on 4 May 2019. The mission was contracted by NASA and was flown by SpaceX.

Launch schedule history
In February 2016, it was announced that NASA had awarded a contract extension to SpaceX for five additional CRS missions (CRS-16 to CRS-20). In June 2016, a NASA Inspector General report had this mission manifested for October 2018, but by January 2019 this had been pushed back to April 2019.

Due to a Dragon 2 test anomaly on 20 April 2019, SpaceX needed to acquire a permit to allow landing on the drone ship, "Of Course I Still Love You". The ship was stationed just  downrange "to ensure the integrity of the area and preserve valuable information".

Primary payload

Cargo in unpressurized section included the Orbiting Carbon Observatory 3 (OCO-3) and STP-H6.

See also
 Uncrewed spaceflights to the International Space Station

References

External links
 
 NASA
 SpaceX official page for the Dragon spacecraft
 Launch date update
 https://www.youtube.com/watch?v=QmvY8ZmN0Ic

SpaceX Dragon
Spacecraft launched in 2019
SpaceX payloads contracted by NASA
Supply vehicles for the International Space Station
Spacecraft which reentered in 2019